Numerous tornado outbreaks have occurred in Oklahoma since modern records have been kept.

Oklahoma tornado outbreak may refer to:
Tornado outbreak of May 10, 1905, including the 1905 Snyder tornado, the second-deadliest tornado in Oklahoma history
Tornado outbreak of April 27–29, 1912, a prolific outbreak featuring several strong-to-violent tornadoes
1947 Glazier–Higgins–Woodward tornadoes, the deadliest tornado event in Oklahoma history and the sixth-deadliest in U.S. history
1948 Tinker Air Force Base tornadoes, an event featuring the first-ever official tornado forecast
1955 Great Plains tornado outbreak, an outbreak featuring several tornadoes throughout Oklahoma, including the destructive Blackwell tornado
Tornado outbreak of April 26, 1991, an outbreak featuring numerous violent tornadoes in northern Oklahoma
1999 Oklahoma tornado outbreak, the most prolific tornado outbreak in Oklahoma history
Tornado outbreak sequence of May 21–26, 2011, an outbreak featuring numerous violent tornadoes in the state
Tornado outbreak of May 18–21, 2013, including the 2013 Moore tornado, the third-costliest tornado on record
Tornado outbreak of May 26–31, 2013, including the 2013 El Reno tornado, the widest tornado on record

See also 
:Category:Tornadoes in Oklahoma